Souleymane Baba Diomandé (born 21 January 1992) is an Ivorian professional football player who is currently playing as a midfielder for Hoogstraten in the Belgian Second Amateur Division.

Club career
He made his debut for Lierse on 14 September 2013 in the Jan Breydel Stadion against Club Brugge. He substituted Julien Vercauteren after 57 minutes and delivered an assist to Rachid Bourabia.

Statistics 

Updated as of 16 December 2013.

References

1992 births
Living people
Ivorian footballers
Association football midfielders
Paris FC players
Lierse S.K. players
Belgian Pro League players